Paul John Weller (born John William Weller; 25 May 1958) is an English singer-songwriter and musician. Weller achieved fame with the punk rock/new wave/mod revival band the Jam (1972–1982). He had further success with the blue-eyed soul music of the Style Council (1983–1989), before establishing himself as a solo artist with his eponymous 1992 album.

Despite widespread critical recognition as a singer, lyricist, and guitarist, Weller has remained a national, rather than international, star and much of his songwriting is rooted in English society. Many of his songs with the Jam had lyrics about working class life. He was the principal figure of the 1970s and 1980s mod revival, often referred to as "The Modfather", and an influence on Britpop bands such as Oasis.

Early life (1958–1975)
Weller was born on 25 May 1958 in Woking, Surrey, England, to John and Ann Weller (née Craddock). Although born John William Weller, he became known as Paul by his parents.

His father worked as a taxi driver and a builder and his mother was a part-time cleaner. Weller started his education at Maybury County First School in 1963. His love of music began with the Beatles, then the Who and Small Faces.  By the time Weller was eleven and moving up to Sheerwater County Secondary school, music was the biggest part of his life, and he had started playing the guitar.

Weller's musical vocation was confirmed after seeing Status Quo in concert in 1972.
He formed the first incarnation of the Jam in the same year, playing bass guitar with his best friends Steve Brookes (lead guitar) and Dave Waller (rhythm guitar). Weller's father, acting as their manager, began booking the band into local working men's clubs. Joined by Rick Buckler on drums, and with Bruce Foxton soon replacing Waller on rhythm guitar, the four-piece band began to forge a local reputation, playing a mixture of Beatles covers and a number of compositions written by Weller and Brookes. Brookes left the band in 1976, and Weller and Foxton decided they would swap guitar roles, with Weller now the guitarist.

Weller became interested in 1960s mod culture in late 1974, particularly after hearing 'My Generation' by the Who. As a result, he began riding a Lambretta scooter, styling his hair like Steve Marriott and immersing himself in 1960s soul and R&B music. At his instigation, the Jam began wearing mohair suits onstage and he and Foxton began playing Rickenbacker guitars (as favoured by the Who and the Beatles in the mid-1960s). He has been a committed mod ever since, declaring in a 1991 interview that, "I'll always be a mod. You can bury me a mod".

The Jam (1976–1982)

The Jam emerged at the same time as punk rock bands such as the Clash, the Damned, and Sex Pistols. The Clash emerged as leading early advocates of the band, and were sufficiently impressed to take them along as the support on their White Riot tour of 1977.

The Jam's first single, "In the City", took them into the UK Top 40 in May 1977. Although every subsequent single had a placing within the Top 40, it was not until the group released the political "The Eton Rifles" that they would break into the Top 10, hitting the No. 3 spot in November 1979. The increasing popularity of their blend of Weller's barbed lyrics with pop melodies eventually led to their first number one single, "Going Underground", in March 1980.

"I like them a lot," remarked Peter Gabriel, who enlisted Weller to play on his third album. "They're one of the new groups who have written the best songs. They're really very good."

The Jam became the first band since the Beatles to perform both sides of the same single ("Town Called Malice" and "Precious") on one edition of Top of the Pops. They also had two singles, "That's Entertainment" and "Just Who Is the 5 O'Clock Hero?", reach No. 21 and No. 8 respectively in the UK singles chart despite not even being released as singles in the UK – they got there purely on the strength of the huge number of people buying import sales of the German and Dutch single releases. The Jam still hold the record for the best-selling import-only singles in the UK charts.

As the band's popularity increased, however, Weller became restless and wanted to explore a more soulful, melodic style of music with a broader instrumentation, and in consequence in 1982 he announced that the Jam would disband at the end of that year. The action came as a surprise to Foxton and Buckler who both felt that the band was still a creative formation with scope to develop further professionally, but Weller was determined to end the band and move on. Their final single, "Beat Surrender", became their fourth UK chart topper, going straight to No. 1 in its first week. Their farewell concerts at Wembley Arena were multiple sell-outs; their final concert took place at the Brighton Centre on 11 December 1982.

The Style Council (1983–1989)

At the beginning of 1983, Weller teamed up with keyboard player Mick Talbot to form a new group called the Style Council. Weller brought in Steve White to play drums, as well as singer Dee C. Lee, who was later to become Weller's girlfriend and then wife. She also had previously been a backing singer with Wham!

Free of the limited musical styles he felt imposed by the Jam, under the collective of the Style Council Weller was able to experiment with a wide range of music, from pop and jazz to Soul/R&B, house and folk-styled ballads. The band was at the vanguard of a jazz/pop revival that would continue with the emergence of bands like Matt Bianco, Sade, and Everything but the Girl, whose members Tracey Thorn and Ben Watt contributed vocals and guitar to the 1984 Style Council song "Paris Match".

Many of the Style Council's early singles performed well in the charts, and Weller would also experience his first success in North America, when "My Ever Changing Moods" and "You're the Best Thing" entered the US Billboard Hot 100. In Australia it was far more successful than the Jam, reaching the top of the charts in 1984 with "Shout to the Top".

Weller appeared on 1984's Band Aid record "Do They Know It's Christmas?" and was called upon to mime the absent Bono's lyrics on Top of the Pops. The Style Council was the second act to appear in the British half of Live Aid at Wembley Stadium in 1985.

In December 1984, Weller put together his own charity ensemble called the Council Collective to make a record, "Soul Deep", to raise money for striking miners, and the family of David Wilkie. The record featured the Style Council plus a number of other performers, notably Jimmy Ruffin and Junior Giscombe. In spite of the song's political content, it still picked up BBC Radio 1 airplay and was performed on Top of the Pops, which led to the incongruous sight of lyrics such as "We can't afford to let the government win / It means death to the trade unions" being mimed amid the show's flashing lights and party atmosphere.

As the 1980s wore on, the Style Council's popularity in the UK began to slide, with the band achieving only one top ten single after 1985. The Style Council's death knell was sounded in 1989 when its record company refused to release its fifth and final studio album, the house-influenced Modernism: A New Decade. With the rejection of this effort, Weller announced that the Style Council had split. It wasn't until the 1998 retrospective CD box set The Complete Adventures of the Style Council that the album would be widely available.

Solo career

Early solo career (1990–1995)
In 1989, Weller found himself without a band and without a recording deal for the first time since he was 17. After taking time off for most of 1990, he returned to the road late in the year, touring as "The Paul Weller Movement" with long-term drummer and friend Steve White and Paul Francis (session bassist from the James Taylor Quartet). After a slow start playing small clubs with a mixture of Jam/Style Council classics as well as showcasing new material such as "Into Tomorrow", by the time of the release of his 1992 LP, Paul Weller, he had begun to re-establish himself as a leading British singer-songwriter. This self-titled album saw a return to a more jazz-guitar-focused sound, featuring samples and a funk influence with shades of the Style Council sound. The album also featured a new producer, Brendan Lynch. Tracks such as "Here's a New Thing" and "That Spiritual Feeling" were marketed among the emerging acid jazz scene.

Buoyed by the positive commercial and critical success of his first solo album, Weller returned to the studio in 1993 with a renewed confidence. Accompanied by Steve White, guitarist Steve Cradock and bassist Marco Nelson, the result of these sessions was the triumphant Mercury Music Prize-nominated Wild Wood, which included the singles "Sunflower" and "Wild Wood".

His 1995 album Stanley Road took him back to the top of the British charts for the first time in a decade, and went on to become the best-selling album of his career. The album, named after the street in Woking where he had grown up, marked a return to the more guitar-based style of his earlier days. The album's major single, "The Changingman", was also a big hit, taking Weller to No. 7 in the UK Singles Chart. Another single, the ballad "You Do Something To Me", was his second consecutive Top 10 single and reached No. 9 in the UK.

Weller found himself heavily associated with the emerging Britpop movement that gave rise to such bands as Oasis, Pulp and Blur. Noel Gallagher (of Oasis) is credited as guest guitarist on the Stanley Road album track "I Walk on Gilded Splinters". Weller also returned the favour, appearing as a guest guitarist and backing vocalist on Oasis' hit song "Champagne Supernova".

The Modfather (1996–2007)

Heavy Soul, the follow-up to the million-selling Stanley Road, saw Weller twist his sound again. The album was more raw than its predecessor; Weller was now frequently playing live in the studio in as few takes as possible. The first single "Peacock Suit" reached No. 5 in the UK Singles Chart, and the album reached No. 2. Success in the charts also came from compilations: "Best Of" albums by the Jam and the Style Council charted, and in 1998 his own solo collection Modern Classics was a substantial success.

In 2000, while living in Send, Surrey, he released his fifth solo studio album, Heliocentric. Once again finding himself without a record contract, Weller's Days of Speed worldwide tour provided him with the opportunity to view his works as one back catalogue, giving rise to a second successful live album in 2001. Days of Speed contained live acoustic versions from the world tour of the same name, including some of his best-known songs from his solo career and the back catalogues of his Jam and Style Council days.

There were rumours at the time that Heliocentric would be Weller's final studio effort, but these proved unfounded when he released the No. 1 hit album Illumination in September 2002. Co-produced by Noonday Underground's Simon Dine, it was preceded by yet another top 10 hit single "It's Written in the Stars". Weller also appears on the 2002 Noonday Underground album called Surface Noise, singing on the track "I'll Walk Right On".

In 2002, Weller collaborated with Terry Callier on the single "Brother to Brother", which featured on Callier's album Speak Your Peace. In 2003, Weller teamed up with electronic rock duo Death in Vegas on a cover of Gene Clark's "So You Say You Lost Your Baby", which featured on their Scorpio Rising album.

In 2004, Weller released an album of covers entitled Studio 150. It debuted at No. 2 in the UK charts and included Bob Dylan's "All Along the Watchtower" as well as covers of songs by Gil Scott-Heron, Rose Royce and Gordon Lightfoot, amongst others.

Weller's 2005 album As Is Now featured the singles "From the Floorboards Up", "Come On/Let's Go" and "Here's the Good News". The album was well-received, though critics noted that he was not moving his music forward stylistically, and it became his lowest-charting album since his 1992 debut.

In February 2006 it was announced that Weller would be the latest recipient of the Lifetime Achievement Award at the BRIT Awards. Despite a tendency to shun such occasions, Weller accepted the award in person, and performed four songs at the ceremony, including the Jam's classic "Town Called Malice". In June 2006, another double live album titled Catch-Flame!, featuring songs from both his solo work and his career with the Jam and the Style Council, was released. In late 2006, the album Hit Parade was released, which collected all the singles released by the Jam, the Style Council and Weller during his solo career. Two versions of this album were released: a single disc with a selection from each stage of his career, and a four-disc limited edition, which included every single released and came with a 64-page booklet. Weller was offered appointment as a Commander of the Order of British Empire in the 2006 birthday honours, but rejected the offer.

In 2007 Weller was guest vocalist on the album issue by the folk musical project the Imagined Village.

Critical success (2008–present)

The double album 22 Dreams was released on 2 June 2008, with "Echoes Round the Sun" as the lead single. Weller had parted company with his existing band before the recording this album, replacing everyone except guitarist Steve Cradock with Andy Lewis on bass, Andy Crofts of the Moons on keys and Steve Pilgrim of the Stands on drums. This album saw Weller move in a more experimental direction, taking in a wide variety of influences including jazz, folk and tango as well as the pop-soul more associated with his Style Council days. Weller also featured on two songs from the Moons' album "Life on Earth", playing piano on "Wondering" and lead guitar on "Last Night on Earth".

Weller was the surprise recipient of the 2009 BRIT award for "Best Male Solo Artist", which resulted in controversy when it was discovered that a suspiciously high number of bets had been placed for Weller to win the award, for which James Morrison was T4's favourite. It was reported that the bookmakers had lost £100,000 in the event, and that as a result would not be taking bets for the awards in the future.

In 2009, Weller guested on Dot Allison's 2009 album, Room 7½, co-writing "Love's Got Me Crazy". November and December also saw him on tour, playing shows across the country.

On 24 February 2010, Weller received the Godlike Genius Award at the NME Awards. His 2010 album, Wake Up the Nation,  was released in April to critical acclaim, and was subsequently nominated for the Mercury Music Prize. The album also marked his first collaboration with Jam bassist Bruce Foxton in 28 years. In May 2010, Weller was presented with the Ivor Novello Lifetime Achievement award, saying "I've enjoyed the last 33 years I've been writing songs and hopefully, with God's good grace, I'll do some more."

On 19 March 2012 Weller released his eleventh studio album Sonik Kicks. The album entered the UK Albums Chart at number 1.

On 17 December 2012 Weller released the Dragonfly EP, a limited edition vinyl run of 3000 copies.

Weller provided vocals on the Moons' 2012 single Something Soon. In December 2012, Weller headlined the Crisis charity gig at the Hammersmith Apollo, where he performed with Emeli Sande, Miles Kane and Bradley Wiggins. On 23 March 2013, Paul Weller played drums on stage with Damon Albarn, Noel Gallagher and Graham Coxon, playing the Blur track "Tender". This was played as part of the Teenage Cancer Trust concerts curated by Noel Gallagher.

In 2014, Weller wrote "Let Me In" for Olly Murs's fourth album Never Been Better.

In 2015, Weller made a West Coast Tour of the US to promote the Saturn's Pattern album. The tour ran from 9 June to 9 October.

In January 2017 he made a cameo appearance in "The Final Problem", the final episode of series four of the BBC TV series Sherlock.

On 8 March 2019, audio and video versions of Other Aspects, Live at the Royal Festival Hall was released. It is the second of two shows and was recorded in October 2018 at London's Royal Festival Hall with an orchestra.

Weller's 15th solo album, On Sunset, was released 3 July 2020 and debuted atop the UK Albums Chart, giving Weller UK number-one albums spanning five consecutive decades. He joins John Lennon and Paul McCartney in having the distinction. His number-one albums: The Gift, as part of the Jam (1982). Our Favourite Shop, as part of the Style Council (1985), and solo albums Stanley Road (1995), Illumination (2002), 22 Dreams (2008), Sonik Kicks (2012), and On Sunset (2020).

Weller's 16th solo album, Fat Pop (Volume 1), was released to critical acclaim on 14 May 2021, and entered the charts at number 1.  On 15 May 2021 Weller recorded live symphonic renditions of songs from his catalogue at the Barbican Centre in London with Jules Buckley and the BBC Symphony Orchestra.  A live album of the recording session, An Orchestrated Songbook, was released in December 2021.

On October 28, 2022, Weller released a B-sides and rarities album Will Of The People. He collaborated on the songs with Richard Fearless, Young Fathers, Straightface and Stone Foundation.

Influences
Since boyhood, Weller has been inspired by a broad range of artists, records and musical styles. Formative influences that have remained relatively constant include the Beatles, The Who, the Small Faces, the Kinks, Tamla Motown, Stax and mid-late 1960s soul, R&B and pop music in general.

During the Jam years, Weller was influenced by early punk bands, including the Sex Pistols and the Clash, and later post-punk acts such as Gang of Four, the Undertones and the Skids. During the final part of the Jam's career, he became more interested in contemporary soul and funk acts, such as Pigbag and Shalamar, as well as 1970s soul and funk artists — most notably Curtis Mayfield.

Jazz became a major influence on Weller's work during the early Style Council years, and he has been a big fan ever since, citing artists such as Lee Morgan, Jimmy Smith, John Coltrane, Alice Coltrane, and Rahsaan Roland Kirk as favourites.

In the late 1980s, his tastes became increasingly eclectic as the Style Council's later releases were influenced by artists as diverse as Claude Debussy and American house music.

During the 1990s, Weller's work began being influenced by late 1960s and early 1970s artists such as Van Morrison, Neil Young, Nick Drake, and Traffic. He also became a big fan of many of the Britpop bands he had influenced, including Oasis, Blur, the Charlatans, Supergrass, and many others. This taste for stripped-down rock music led to Weller's music being dismissed as "dad-rock" by sections of the music press, most notably the NME, during the late 1990s, who cast Weller as a miserable, angry old man — a 1997 front cover of the paper titled an interview with Weller "Let's Get Ready to Grumble".

Despite telling Mojo magazine on 2000 that he did not "make music with fuzzy radios or electric spoons", from the late 2000s onwards, Weller began incorporating more and more experimental influences into his music, citing the likes of Neu! and Broadcast as influential. He also embraced the influence of David Bowie, despite having once said that all but three of his records were "pish".

Among the many albums that Weller has cited as all-time favourites are Odessey and Oracle, Sgt. Pepper's Lonely Hearts Club Band, What's Going On, Innervisions, Low, Journey in Satchidananda, Village Green Preservation Society, the Small Faces eponymous 1967 album, Traffic's eponymous 1968 album, McCartney, Down by the Jetty, and My Generation. Other songs he has nominated as favourites include the Beatles' "Tomorrow Never Knows" and "Strawberry Fields Forever", the Small Faces' "Tin Soldier", James Brown's "Get Up (I Feel Like Being a) Sex Machine", Declan O'Rourke's "Galileo (Someone Like You)", the Kinks' "Waterloo Sunset" and "Days", and Pharrell Williams' "Happy".

In 2012, Weller invaded a live radio interview with singer-songwriter Gilbert O'Sullivan to praise his songs 'Alone Again (Naturally)' and 'Nothing Rhymed' as "two of my favourite songs, great lyrics, great tunes".

He has curated numerous playlists and CDs for magazines over the years. In 2003, a compilation called Under the Influence was released, featuring 15 tracks chosen by Weller. In 2009, he picked 13 "real R&B and soul" tracks for a compilation called Lost & Found.

During the Jam and early Style Council years, Weller worked various literary influences into this work, most notably George Orwell, romantic poet Percy Shelley, and poet friends Dave Waller and Aidan Cant.

His favourite film is A Clockwork Orange.

Personal life

Between the summer of 1977 and around August 1985, Weller was in a relationship with Gill Price, a fashion designer from Bromley. She and their relationship inspired several Jam songs, including "I Need You (For Someone)", "Aunties & Uncles", "English Rose", "Fly", and "Happy Together". She worked in the Jam's offices, contributed to Weller's fanzines, and frequently toured with them — she can be seen in various behind-the-scenes photos. She appeared on the sleeve of the final Jam single, 'Beat Surrender', and along with Weller's sister Nicky, she also had a cameo in the video for the Style Council's 'My Ever Changing Moods'.

At the height of the Style Council's success, Weller and Dee C. Lee, the Style Council's backing singer, began a romantic relationship. The couple married in 1987 and divorced in 1998. They have two children, Leah and Nathaniel (Natt), who is also a working musician and once appeared on stage with his father at Hammersmith Apollo at age 12.

Weller has another daughter, Dylan, with make-up artist, Lucy Halperin.

Weller became involved with Samantha Stock whilst he was recording at the Manor studio, later having two children together, Jesamine (Jessie) and Stevie Mac (Mac).

In October 2008, Stock and Weller broke up and Weller moved in with Hannah Andrews, a backing singer on his 22 Dreams album, who has also toured with his band. They first met in New York in 2005 and married in September 2010 on the Italian island of Capri. The couple have twin boys, John Paul and Bowie, who were born in 2012, and a daughter, Nova, born in 2017.

In April 2014, Weller won £10,000 in damages from Associated Newspapers after "plainly voyeuristic" photographs of his family out shopping were published on MailOnline.

On 24 April 2009, John Weller, Paul Weller's father and long-time manager since the days of the Jam, died from pneumonia at the age of 77.

Weller has been teetotal since 2010.

Political views and activism

Weller has a long association with British politics. In the Jam's first NME interview in May 1977, he famously announced that the band would vote Conservative at the next election, something he has long since claimed was a joke.

From late 1980, he became increasingly interested in CND, often being pictured wearing a CND badge (as in the video for "Town Called Malice") and playing rallies with both the Jam and the Style Council. In tandem, he became more vocally socialist in interviews, and between around 1982 and 1987, his songwriting also became increasingly politicised, most notably on "Trans-Global Express", "Money-Go-Round", "The Big Boss Groove", 'Soul Deep' and the majority of Our Favourite Shop.

In late 1984, Weller took part in Band Aid and then put together his own benefit record for the UK miners' strike, which was called "Soul Deep" and credited to the Council Collective. The 12" of the single featured interviews with striking miners, although half of the money raised went to the widow of David Wilkie, a taxi driver who was killed whilst driving strike-breaking miners to their shift. During the 1980s, Weller was also vegetarian and concerned with animal rights. As a result, he wrote the song "Bloodsports", which was included on the B-side of the Style Council's 1985 single, "Walls Come Tumbling Down". Royalties from the track were donated to a defence fund for two hunt saboteurs then on remand in Bristol Prison.

From the latter half of 1985, Weller was highly involved in the formation of Red Wedge, a left-wing collective of musicians and actors etc. who aimed to "bring left-wing ideas to other people". However, from around 1988 onwards, he became less politically vocal, ultimately claiming during the 1990s that he no longer particularly believed in any politics.

In 2008, after then-Conservative Party leader and former Eton pupil David Cameron chose the Jam's "The Eton Rifles" as one of his Desert Island Discs, Weller expressed disgust, saying, "It wasn't intended as a fucking jolly drinking song for the cadet corp." When asked about it again in 2015, he told Mojo magazine: "The whole thing with Cameron saying it was one of his favourite songs... I just think, 'Which bit didn't you get?" Weller also began playing the song live again for the first time since 1982.

During the mid-2010s, Weller made a brief return to the political arena, being vocally supportive of then-Labour Party leader Jeremy Corbyn and even playing a 'Concert for Corbyn' in December 2016.

Legacy 
The Daily Telegraph said of Weller: "Apart from David Bowie, it's hard to think of any British solo artist who's had as varied, long-lasting and determinedly forward-looking a career." The BBC described Weller in 2007 as "one of the most revered music writers and performers of the past 30 years". In 2012, he was among the British notables selected by the artist Sir Peter Blake to appear in a new version of his most famous artwork – the Beatles' Sgt. Pepper's Lonely Hearts Club Band album cover – to celebrate the British social figures of his life. He has received four Brit Awards, winning the award for Best British Male three times, and the 2006 Brit Award for Outstanding Contribution to Music.

Discography

Studio albums
 Paul Weller (1992)
 Wild Wood (1993)
 Stanley Road (1995)
 Heavy Soul (1997)
 Heliocentric (2000)
 Illumination (2002)
 Studio 150 (2004)
 As Is Now (2005)
 22 Dreams (2008)
 Wake Up the Nation (2010)
 Sonik Kicks (2012)
 Saturns Pattern (2015)
 A Kind Revolution (2017)
 True Meanings (2018)
 On Sunset (2020)
 Fat Pop (Volume 1) (2021)

References

Further reading

External links

 
 

1958 births
Brit Award winners
English new wave musicians
English rock singers
English male singer-songwriters
English punk rock musicians
English record producers
English socialists
English rock guitarists
English soul singers
Ivor Novello Award winners
Living people
Male new wave singers
Mod revival musicians
NME Awards winners
Parlophone artists
People from Woking
Sophisti-pop musicians
The Jam members
The Style Council members
Lead guitarists
English male guitarists
Incognito (band) members
Go! Discs Records artists
Island Records artists
Independiente Records artists
V2 Records artists
BT Digital Music Awards winners